Boiken Creek is a creek in northern Papua New Guinea.

See also
List of rivers of Papua New Guinea
Boiken language

References

Rivers of Papua New Guinea